The Farmer–Citizen Movement (BBB) is an agrarian political party in the Netherlands. It is headquartered in Deventer, Overijssel. The current party leader is Caroline van der Plas, who founded it in 2019.

History 
The Farmer–Citizen Movement was founded in October 2019 by agricultural journalist Caroline van der Plas, together with Wim Groot Koerkamp and Henk Vermeer from agricultural marketing firm ReMarkAble, in response to the widespread farmers protests that had taken place earlier that month. On 17 October 2020, Van der Plas was unanimously chosen as the party's lijsttrekker. It won one seat at the 2021 general election.

The BBB won the 2023 Dutch provincial elections, receiving the most seats in all 12 provinces. Since the provincial councils elect the Dutch Senate, the party is predicted to win 17 seats in the 2023 Dutch Senate election, the most of any party.

Ideology
In the 2021 Dutch general election, the Farmer–Citizen Movement focused its campaign on issues important to rural and agrarian voters, including pledges for a "Ministry of the Countryside" located at least 100 kilometers from The Hague, and a removal of the ban on neonicotinoids. The party called for a Right to Agriculture Act which would allow for farmers to have more say on agricultural expansion matters. This was in response to local opposition to pig and goat farms over public health, environmental and agricultural concerns.

The BBB supports Dutch membership of the EU for trading purposes, but wants to reduce the power of the EU "to a level of how the EEC was once intended" and opposes the EU becoming a federal superstate. The BBB also supports Dutch membership of NATO and has called for providing Ukraine with F-16s.

Caroline van der Plas has stated that the Party for the Animals and Wakker Dier are two of the BBB's biggest enemies, and that the BBB uses its social media presence to provide an alternative perspective.

Electoral results

House of Representatives

Provincial councils

See also 
Farmers' Party (Netherlands)

References

External links

  

Agrarian parties
Conservative parties in the Netherlands
Political parties established in 2019
2019 establishments in the Netherlands
Organisations based in Overijssel
Populism in the Netherlands